Alessandro Capone may refer to:
 Alessandro Capone (director)
 Alessandro Capone (linguist)